Las Aventuras del Capitán Piluso en el castillo del terror (The Adventures of Captain Piluso in the Castle of Terror) is a 1963 black-and-white Argentine family comedy film directed by Francis Lauric and written by Humberto Ortiz. The film starred Alberto Olmedo and Humberto Ortiz.

Cast
 Alberto Olmedo ....  Capitán Piluso
 Humberto Ortiz ....  Coquito
 Lalo Hartich
 Martín Karadagián
 Juan Carlos Barbieri
 Ricardo Carenzo
 Rodolfo Crespi
 José Del Vecchio
 Diego Marcote
 Aldo Mayo
 María Esther Podestá
 Semillita
 Félix Tortorelli

Filming location and premiere date
The movie was filmed on location in Buenos Aires and premiered there on December 19, 1963.

External links
 

1963 films
Argentine black-and-white films
1960s Spanish-language films
1963 comedy films
Argentine comedy films
1960s Argentine films